La mosca y la sopa [The fly and the soup] is the fifth album by Argentine rock band Patricio Rey y sus Redonditos de Ricota, released in 1991. It was recorded through 1990 and 1991. This is the third Patricio Rey album to feature Lito Vitale on the keyboards.

Background 
La mosca y la sopa is often cited as a major influence in the early development of the band music. Commercially, it was one of the Patricio Rey's most successful album, topping the charts in several FM radios with songs as "Toxi-Taxi", "Mi perro dinamita" and "Un poco de amor francés".

The band presented La mosca y la sopa at the Estadio Obras Sanitarias in 1991, where had incidents with the police and the fans before the concert, where Walter Bulaccio was arrested, which ended with his death from severe injuries by the Police Repression.

Track listing 
All songs were written by Solari/Beilinson, except "Mi perro dinamita", written by Semilla Buccarelli.

Personnel 
Patricio Rey
Indio Solari - Vocals
Skay Beilinson - Guitars
Semilla Buccarelli - Bass guitar, Piano on "Mi perro dinamita"
Walter Sidotti - Drums and percussion
Sergio Dawi - Saxophone

Guests
Luis "Mississippi" Robinson - Harp on "Tarea fina"
Lito Vitale - Piano on "Blues de la artillería"

Additional Personnel
Rocambole - Art Cover and Design
Mario Breuer, Roberto Fernadez and Gustavo Gaury - Engineers
Poly - Management

References

Patricio Rey y sus Redonditos de Ricota albums
1991 albums